Solibacillus silvestris is a Gram-positive, aerobic and rod-shaped bacterium from the genus of Solibacillus which has been isolated from forest soil near Braunschweig in Germany.

References 

Bacillales
Bacteria described in 1999